Ellen Gabriel (born 1959), also known as Katsi'tsakwas, is a Mohawk activist and artist from Kanehsatà:ke Nation – Turtle Clan, known for her involvement as the official spokesperson, chosen by the People of the Longhouse, during the Oka Crisis.

Biography
In March 1990, she joined in the movement against the expansion of a golf course in Oka, Quebec. That event eventually escalated into the Oka Crisis. In order to raise awareness of the crisis, she traveled internationally, including visits to The Hague, Strasbourg and Japan. During this time, in May 1990, she received a Bachelor of Fine Arts from Concordia University.

In 1993, the documentary Kanehsatake: 270 Years of Resistance was released; she was a prominent part of the film.

The next decade after the crisis had been settled,  she worked as an Art Teacher for the 
Mohawk Immersion School at Kahnawà:ke.

In 2004, she was elected president of the Quebec Native Women's Association. She held the position until December 2010. During this time she brought changes to the  Indian Act in the form of Bill C-31.

On 19 May 2009, she gave a speech to the eighth session of the United Nations Permanent Forum on Indigenous Issues.

Between 11–15 July 2011, she gave a speech to the fourth session of the Expert Mechanism on the Rights of Indigenous Peoples.

In the Summer of 2012, she ran for National Chief of the Assembly of First Nations. She passed to the second round of votes and was eliminated in the second round due to misinformation on the floor which rumored she had withdrawn and given her votes to Shawn Atleo.

On 7 May 2013, in regards to Bill S-2, she gave a speech to the 41st Parliament, 1st Session at the Standing Committee on the Status of Women.

Honours
Golden Eagle Award from the Native Women’s Association of Canada, 2005
International Women’s Day Award from the Barreau du Québec/Québec Bar Association
Jigonsaseh Women of Peace Award, 2008

References

External links
Gabriel's Twitter Account
Gabriel's Blog

1959 births
Living people
Canadian Mohawk people
First Nations women
First Nations activists
First Nations artists
Concordia University alumni
20th-century First Nations people
21st-century First Nations people
20th-century Canadian women artists
First Nations women artists